Mpama (Pama) is a Bantu language of Kasai, Democratic Republic of Congo. It is spoken by the Mpama people.

References

Bangi-Ntomba languages